Sa, SA, S.A. or s.a. may refer to:

Arts, media and entertainment

Music
 SA  AS an initialism of the soprano and alto voice types for which a piece of music was written
 SA (Samurai Attack), a Japanese punk rock band
 SA Martinez, a vocalist and DJ for the band 311
 Soziedad Alkoholika, a Spanish punk rock band
 SA, a 2018 album by Jonathan Richman

Other media
 Sa (film), a 2016 Indian film
 S.A (manga), a manga series by Maki Minami
 Something Awful, a comedy website
 Star Awards, an annual Singaporean television award ceremony
 Subterranean Animism, a video game from the Touhou series by ZUN

Language and writing
 Sa (cuneiform), a cuneiform sign
 sa (hieroglyph), an Egyptian hieroglyph meaning "protection"
 Sa (kana) (さ and サ), a Japanese kana
 Saa language, spoken in Vanuatu
 Sanskrit (ISO 639-1 code: sa), a historical Indo-Aryan language, the liturgical language of Hinduism
 sine anno, Latin term for "without year" used in bibliographies to indicate items which do not record the year of publication
 sub anno (s.a. or sa), Latin term for "under the year" in annals which record by year
 Sa (Javanese) (ꦱ), a letter in the Javanese script

Businesses and organizations

Military and paramilitary
 Soviet Army (Sovetskaya Armiya)
 Sturmabteilung (SA), a paramilitary wing of the German Nazi Party (NSDAP), also known as the Brownshirts

Political organisations
 Socialist Action (disambiguation), several organisations
 Socialist Alliance (Australia), a Socialist political party
 Socialist Alliance (England), a political party in England
 Socialist Alternative (Australia), a Marxist political organisation

Other businesses and organizations
 Common nickname of System Architect, the Enterprise Architecture product
 S.A. (corporation), a type of corporation in various countries
 San Antonio Spurs the National Basketball Association
 S.A. (Salvation Army), an international church and charity
 Sexaholics Anonymous, a sex-addiction recovery group based on the 12-steps of AA
 Shooting Australia, governing body for target shooting sports in Australia
 Smokers Anonymous
 South African Airways (IATA airline designator: SA)
 Sports Authority, a defunct U.S. sporting goods retailer
 Success Academy Charter Schools, term commonly abbreviated to 'Success Academy'

Places
 Vehicle registration plate for the Province of Salerno, Italy
 SA postcode area, UK, a group of postal districts in Wales
 Sakha Republic, Russia, a federal Russian republic
 Saline County, Kansas, U.S.
 San Antonio, Texas, U.S.
 Sarajevo (official city abbreviation)
 Saudi Arabia (two-letter country code)
 South Asia
 South Africa
 South America
 South Australia

Science, technology, and mathematics

Biology and medicine
 Salicylic acid, a plant hormone
 Spontaneous abortion
 Sustained action, a longer-acting form of a medication
 Surface area
Sense of agency

Computing and telecommunications
 .sa, the country code top level domain (ccTLD) for Saudi Arabia
 Security association in the IPsec networking protocol
 Selective availability, a mechanism for degrading the precision of the civilian GPS network
 Simulated annealing, an optimisation technique
 Software architect
 Software architecture
 Microsoft Software Assurance
 Structured analysis, a software engineering technique
 Suffix array, a sorted array of all suffixes of a string
 System administrator
 System architecture
 Systems analysis
 Systems analyst

Other uses in science, technology, and mathematics
 Sa (Islamic measure), Arabic measure of volume
 Samarium (former chemical symbol: Sa), a rare earth metal
 Single action, a type of firearm trigger
 Situation awareness, a component of aviation safety and other socio-technical systems
 Spectral acceleration, in seismology and earthquake engineering
 Superabundant number, a type of number (mathematical concept)
 Unbarred spiral galaxy
 Short axis, in single-photon emission computed tomography
 Surface area

Other uses
 Sa (Mandaeism), a type of Mandaean sacramental bread that is rolled up
 Seaman apprentice, a U.S. Navy and Coast Guard rank
 Secrecy agreement, a legal contract for confidentiality
 Sex appeal, attraction on the basis of sexual desire
 Sexual assault, the intentional act of sexually touching another person without their consent
 Share-alike, a term used in Creative Commons licensing
 Second Amendment to the constitutions of several sovereign states and subnational entities
 Second Amendment to the United States Constitution, the most common meaning of "Second Amendment"
 Single adult (LDS Church), a designation in The Church of Jesus Christ of Latter-day Saints for unmarried individuals 18 and older; sometimes used specifically to refer to unmarried individuals over 30
 Special agent, a position usually held by investigative officers within certain law enforcement agencies in the United States
 sub anno, the year under which events are recorded in chronicles
 San Andreas (disambiguation)

See also
 Sá, a Portuguese surname
 Sa (萨), a rare Chinese surname of Semu origin (see 雁门萨氏)
 Semi-automatic (disambiguation)